Spaces: The Architecture of Paul Rudolph is a 1983 American short documentary film narrated by Cliff Robertson and produced by Bob Eisenhardt about the work of architect Paul Rudolph. It was nominated for an Academy Award for Best Documentary Short.

References

External links

1983 films
American short documentary films
1980s short documentary films
Documentary films about architecture
1980s English-language films
1980s American films